The Immoral is a 2013 Norwegian comedy film directed by Lars Daniel Krutzkoff Jacobsen. It was screened in the Contemporary World Cinema section at the 2013 Toronto International Film Festival.

Cast
 Daniel Gjerde
 Hanne Bach Hansen
 Kjetil Krogstad Skrede

References

External links
 

2013 films
2013 comedy films
Norwegian comedy films
2010s Norwegian-language films